Aqumayu (Quechua for "sand river") may refer to:

Rivers
 Aqumayu (Cusco), in the Cusco Region, Peru
 Aqumayu (Huánuco), in the Huánuco Region, Peru

Places 
 Acomayo, a location in the Acomayo Province, Cusco Region, Peru
 Acomayo District, a district in the Acomayo Province, Cusco Region, Peru
 Acomayo Province, a province in the Cusco Region, Peru